Abdelmajid Lamriss (born 12 February 1959) is a Moroccan football defender who played for Morocco in the 1986 FIFA World Cup. He also played for FAR Rabat.

References

External links
FIFA profile

1959 births
Moroccan footballers
Morocco international footballers
Association football defenders
AS FAR (football) players
Botola players
Olympic footballers of Morocco
Footballers at the 1984 Summer Olympics
1986 African Cup of Nations players
1988 African Cup of Nations players
1986 FIFA World Cup players
Living people
Mediterranean Games gold medalists for Morocco
Mediterranean Games medalists in football
Competitors at the 1983 Mediterranean Games